Jean Castaing (1723 in Alençon – March 1805 in Alençon) was an 18th-century French poet, playwright and printer.

Biography 
Both an author, typographer, or bookbinder, Castaing who by profession was collector of the taille in his hometown, is the author of several plays printed by himself in his print shop. This collection, whose plays have been described as "as bad as misprinted", has no other merit than its rarity. The author says ingenuously in his preface that by printing 30 copies of his theater, "he had no other purpose than to distract himself, without the annoyance to bother over thirty people". According to the same preface, it seems that this theater was to consist of four volumes, unless one counts for the fourth volume la Femme curieuse, printed in 1793, and which is part of Volume III. Because of this, his poetry and theater are extremely rare. The local historian Léon de La Sicotière 
had his complete theatrical and poetic productions, printed to a very small number of copies in his rich library. Several of Castaing's plays have been performed on the stage of Alencon.

Founder of the Alençonnaise Masonic lodge ("Saint-Louis-des-Cœurs-Zélés"), in 1752, he represented the masonry from Orne at the creation of the Grand Orient de France in 1773.

Works 
 Vaudevilles et Chansons du Bouquet des Moissonneurs, divertissement-mascarade, Alençon, 1783, in-8°.
 Recueil de pièces de théâtre, Alençon, 1791-2, 3 vol. in-8°. 
 The Bibliothèque dramatique by Martineau de Soleinne (1844) contains the most complete list of drama works by Jean Castaing, that is:
 Apologie de ma solitude
 Prologue et scènes allégoriques
 Le Philosophe soi-disant
 Prologue de Lise
 Lise, ou le triomphe de la reconnaissance
 La Fête du village
 l'Avant-Soupé
 Le Véritable ami
 Le Misanthrope corrigé
 Tout ou Rien
 Paméla
 Paméla mariée
 La Femme curieuse, ou les Francs-Maçons 
  Autres créations littéraires de Jean Castaing conservées à la BNF :
 Opuscules d'un amateur, imprimé par lui-même.Tome premier (1785)
 Opuscules de J.Castaing, revus, corrigés et augmentés, imprimés par lui-même, 2e édition.- Distiques et pensées morales et philosophiques, imprimés par lui-même. 2e édition (1790)
 Fugitives de J.Castaing, imprimées par lui-même (1794)

References

Sources 
 Jacques-Charles Brunet, Manuel du libraire et de l’amateur de livres, t.1, Paris, Silvestre, (p. 569).
 Théodore-Éloi Lebreton, Biographie normande, t. 1, Rouen, Le Brument, 1865, (p. 385).
 Joseph-Marie Quérard, La France littéraire, ou Dictionnaire bibliographique des savants, t.2, Paris, Firmin-Didot, 1828, (p. 72)
 Bulletin de la société historique et archéologique de l’Orne, t. III, Alençon, Renaut-De Broise, (p. 410–1).
 L’Intermédiaire des chercheurs et curieux, t.7, Paris, Sandoz et Fischbacher, 1874, (p. 412).
 Revue de l'exposition maçonnique 2003 du  under the direction of Éric Saunier, (p. 10)
 Bibliothèque dramatique de Monsieur Alexandre Martineau de Soleinne. Catalogue rédigé par P. L. Jacob, bibliophile. Paris, Alliance des Arts, 1843-1845, 6 vol.

External links 
 Jean castaing on data.bnf.fr

18th-century French poets
18th-century French male writers
18th-century French dramatists and playwrights
French printers
Writers from Normandy
French Freemasons
1723 births
Writers from Alençon
1805 deaths